Marcus Arnette Thigpen (born May 15, 1986) is a former American professional Canadian football running back and kick returner. He played college football at Indiana University and signed with the Philadelphia Eagles as an undrafted free agent in 2009. Thigpen has also been a member of the Denver Broncos, Hamilton Tiger-Cats, Miami Dolphins, New England Patriots, Tampa Bay Buccaneers, Buffalo Bills, Indianapolis Colts, Oakland Raiders, and Saskatchewan Roughriders.

Early years
Thigpen attended Mumford High School in Detroit, Michigan and was a letterman in football and track. During his high school career, he was one of the top sprinters in the state of Michigan.  During his senior year (2004), he won the MHSAA Division I 100-meter dash with a time of 10.82 and led Mumford to its third consecutive outdoor state track and field title in as many years.  He also led the Detroit Public School League with 1,785 yards and twenty touchdowns.  In 2011, Mumford won its 11th state track and field championship in the school's history.

College career
After high school, Thigpen enrolled at Indiana University but was redshirted his freshman year.  During his four years of competition (2005-2008), he finished his career as the third best kick returner (2,009 yards) in the school's history.  He also ranks third in all-purpose yards with 4,655 and scored 21 touchdowns.  He was the first IU player to get more than 1,000 yards in rushing (1,621), receiving (1,028) and kick returning (2,009).  He was selected as one of the team's captains as a fifth-year senior and was named IU's offensive player of the year in 2008.  He graduated in 2009 with a major in social/behavioral science and criminal justice.

Track and field

Thigpen led the Hoosiers with a 2006 season-best time of 10.65 in the 100 meters, which he clocked at the Big Ten Outdoor Championships, good for sixth place. He also ran the first leg of IU's 4 x 100 meter relay team that clocked 40.13 seconds, which is the third fastest time in IU history at the NCAA Mideast Regional Championship. In 2006, he took seventh in the 60 meters, with a time of 6.89 seconds and sixth in the 200 meters, with a time of 21.94 seconds at the Big Ten indoor meet, and he placed seventh in the 100 meters at the Big Ten outdoor meet, with a time of 10.75 seconds.

His personal bests are 6.77 seconds in the 60 meters, 10.34 seconds in the 100 meters and 21.27 seconds in the 200 meters.

Personal bests

Professional career

2009 Indiana's Pro Day Combine

Philadelphia Eagles
After going undrafted in the 2009 NFL Draft, Thigpen was signed as an undrafted free agent by the Philadelphia Eagles on April 27, 2009. He was waived on August 4.

Denver Broncos
Thigpen signed with the Denver Broncos on August 16, 2009. He was waived on August 26.

Saskatchewan Roughriders
Thigpen signed a practice roster agreement with the Saskatchewan Roughriders on October 2, 2009. He was removed from the practice roster and signed to the active roster on November 7. He was part of the final cuts following the 2010 training camp.

Hamilton Tiger-Cats
Thigpen was signed to the Hamilton Tiger-Cats' active roster on June 26, 2010. He returned the team's first kickoff of the 2010 season for a touchdown against the Winnipeg Blue Bombers and was named the CFL Special Teams Player of Week 1. In week 2, he returned a Burke Dales punt for a touchdown and caught a touchdown pass. On August 13, 2010, after rushing for a touchdown, Thigpen became the first player in CFL history to score a touchdown five different ways in one season. In total, he had scored on a kickoff return, punt return, missed field goal return, a running play and a reception.

Miami Dolphins
Thigpen was signed to a reserve/future contract by the Dolphins on January 12, 2012.

On September 9, 2012, Thigpen returned a punt 72 yards for a touchdown in his first NFL game versus the Houston Texans.  This was the first punt return touchdown by the Miami Dolphins since 2007, when Ted Ginn Jr. returned a punt for a TD versus the Philadelphia Eagles. On November 15, 2012, Thigpen returned a kickoff 96 yards for a touchdown against the Buffalo Bills.  On December 15, 2013, he caught a 14-yard touchdown strike from Ryan Tannehill  with 1:15 left in the 4th quarter to provide the winning margin over the New England Patriots, which put an end to the Patriots' string of three come-from-behind victories in 2013 and also snapped the Dolphins' seven-game losing streak to New England.

Thigpen was released by Miami during their final cuts on August 30, 2014.

New England Patriots
On September 3, 2014, Thigpen was signed by the New England Patriots to their practice squad and released a week later on September 10, 2014.

Miami Dolphins (II)
On September 23, 2014, Thigpen was re-signed by the Miami Dolphins to their practice squad. His position was changed from running back to wide receiver, and he changed from uniform number 34 to 19.

Tampa Bay Buccaneers
Thigpen signed with the Tampa Bay Buccaneers practice squad on October 21, 2014. He was promoted to the active roster on October 31, 2014, after Trindon Holliday was waived/injured.

Buffalo Bills
Due to an injury to starter Leodis McKelvin, Thigpen was claimed off waivers by the Buffalo Bills on November 26, 2014. In the Bills game against the Green Bay Packers, Thigpen took a Tim Masthay punt at the Buffalo 25, sprinted to the left hash mark and then  to the left sideline for a 75-yard touchdown.  This play gave Buffalo a 7–3 lead and was vital to the 21-13 Buffalo win. It also earned Thigpen Peter King's MMQB Special Teams Player of the Week Award.

Thigpen was released from the Bills on October 7 in favor of wide receiver Denarius Moore.

Indianapolis Colts
Thigpen signed with Indianapolis Colts on October 12, 2015, but was released several days later on October 17, never playing a game with the team.

Oakland Raiders
Thigpen signed with the Oakland Raiders on November 4, 2015.
Thigpen was waived by the Raiders on November 14, 2015.

Buffalo Bills (II) 
On November 25, 2015, Thigpen re-signed with the Buffalo Bills. On December 22, 2015, the Bills waived Thigpen.

Saskatchewan Roughriders (II) 
On September 12, 2017, the Saskatchewan Roughriders announced that they had signed Thigpen to their practice roster as a kick returner. Thigpen played in only two regular season games for the Riders in 2017, carrying the ball seven times for 32 yards, and catching two passes for 31 yards. He also returned two punts and one kick return. Playing mainly as a running back in the 2017 Eastern Semi-final game in Ottawa, he amassed 169 rushing yards, including a 75-yard touchdown, placing him third all-time for a Saskatchewan player in a playoff game. He also had 38 yards on two kickoff returns to help defeat the Ottawa Redblacks 31–20. On March 12, 2018, Thigpen was suspended two-games by the CFL for violating the leagues drug policy; Thigpen tested positive for the banned substance dehydrochloromethyltestosterone. Thigpen set CFL career highs in rushing attempts (48) and yards (408) and rushing touchdowns (4) in 13 games with the Riders in the 2018 season. He also caught 24 passes for 233 yards, and returned 21 kickoffs, and 13 punts. Following the season he was re-signed by the Riders. The Roughriders released Thigpen on February 5, 2020.

Toronto Argonauts
On February 10, 2020, Thigpen signed with the Toronto Argonauts. After the CFL canceled the 2020 season due to the COVID-19 pandemic, Thigpen chose to opt-out of his contract with the Argonauts on September 3, 2020.

References

External links

 Toronto Argonauts bio
 Hamilton Tiger-Cats bio
 Indiana Hoosiers bio

1986 births
Living people
American football return specialists
American football running backs
American football wide receivers
American players of Canadian football
Canadian football running backs
Denver Broncos players
Hamilton Tiger-Cats players
Indiana Hoosiers football players
Mumford High School alumni
Philadelphia Eagles players
Players of American football from Detroit
Saskatchewan Roughriders players
Canadian Football League Rookie of the Year Award winners
Miami Dolphins players
New England Patriots players
Tampa Bay Buccaneers players
Buffalo Bills players
African-American players of American football
African-American players of Canadian football
Indianapolis Colts players
Oakland Raiders players
Toronto Argonauts players
21st-century African-American sportspeople
20th-century African-American people